Get It On may refer to:

Songs
 "Get it On" (Diesel song), 1995
 "Get It On" (Grinderman song), 2007
 "Get It On" (Intenso Project song), 2004
 "Get It On" (Kingdom Come song), 1988
 "Get It On" (Kumi Koda song), 2006
 "Get It On" (T. Rex song), retitled "Bang a Gong (Get It On)" in the U.S., 1971; covered by the Power Station, 1985
 "Get It On", by Chase from Chase, 1971; prompted the retitling of the T. Rex song
 "Get It On", by Metro Station from Savior, 2015
 "Get It On", by Rasheeda from Dirty South, 2001
 "Get It On", by Turbonegro from Apocalypse Dudes, 1998
 "Get It On", by Vains of Jenna, 2009

Albums
 Get It On, by Pacific Gas & Electric, 1968
 Get It On!, by Fraternity of Man, 1969
 Tripping Daisy Live – Get It On, by Tripping Daisy, 1994

See also
 Let's Get It On, a 1973 album by Marvin Gaye
 "Let's Get It On" (song), the title song
 Get It On...Tonite, a 1999 album by Montell Jordan